Danilo I  may refer to:

 Danilo I, Serbian Archbishop
 Danilo I, Metropolitan of Cetinje
 Danilo I, Prince of Montenegro

See also
 Order of Prince Danilo I
 Crown Prince Danilo I of Montenegro
 Danilo Petrović-Njegoš (disambiguation)
 Danilo II (disambiguation)
 Danilo III (disambiguation)